Daley Peters (born September 18, 1984) is a Canadian curler from Winnipeg, Manitoba. He currently plays third on Team Corey Chambers.

Career
Peters was a back to back Manitoba Junior curling champion in 2004 and 2005, the first Junior Men's skip to repeat in Manitoba in nearly a decade. Beginning in 2009, he curled with his father and former Labatt Brier champion, Vic Peters. Daley was also a former member and skip of the Jason Gunnlaugson team, before that squad went on to curl in the 2009 Canadian Olympic Curling Trials.

Personal life
Daley's sister Liz won the 2008 Canadian Junior Curling Championships as a member of the Kaitlyn Lawes team and later a silver medal at the 2021 Canadian Olympic Curling Trials playing second for Tracy Fleury.

References

External links

Living people
Curlers from Winnipeg
1985 births
Canadian male curlers
Canadian Mennonites